Hoover vs. The Kennedys: The Second Civil War is a four-hour 1987 made-for-television mini-series depicting the political struggles between FBI Director J. Edgar Hoover and President John F. Kennedy and Attorney General Robert F. Kennedy. The series was produced by Operation Prime Time.

Synopsis 
The film takes place between the 1960 Democratic National Convention in July 1960 and the Assassination of Robert F. Kennedy in June 1968, with the majority of the mini-series focusing on the Kennedy Administration (1961–1963).

Other sub-plots include Bobby Kennedy's frustration with his elder brother's politically risky womanizing and his often turbulent relationship with Hoover and the Civil Rights leadership of the era. The mini-series also touches on the alleged bargains Joseph P. Kennedy Sr. made with Mafia figures in order to get his son elected to the U.S. presidency.

Production 
Hoover vs. The Kennedys was primarily filmed on location in and around Toronto, Ontario.

Cast
 Robert Pine as John F. Kennedy
 Nicholas Campbell as Robert F. Kennedy
 Jack Warden as J. Edgar Hoover
 Richard Anderson as Lyndon B. Johnson
 Barry Morse as Joseph P. Kennedy Sr.
 Marc Strange as Clyde Tolson
 Leland Gantt as Martin Luther King Jr.
 Djanet Sears as Coretta Scott King
 Heather Thomas as Marilyn Monroe
 Jennifer Dale as Jacqueline Kennedy
 Nicholas Walker as Peter Lawford
 Brioni Farrell - Judith Campbell

See also
Kennedy (TV miniseries)
Prince Jack
The Kennedys (TV miniseries)
Cultural depictions of John F. Kennedy

References

1980s Canadian television miniseries
1987 Canadian television series debuts
1987 Canadian television series endings
Television series based on actual events
Films about John F. Kennedy
Films about Robert F. Kennedy
Films about the Kennedy family
Cultural depictions of John F. Kennedy
Cultural depictions of Robert F. Kennedy
Cultural depictions of Jacqueline Kennedy Onassis
Cultural depictions of Lyndon B. Johnson
Cultural depictions of Marilyn Monroe
Cultural depictions of J. Edgar Hoover
Cultural depictions of Martin Luther King Jr.
Works about Marilyn Monroe
Canadian political drama television series